Ernest Kidd (25 May 1900 – 1974) was a footballer who played in the Football League for Ashington and Wigan Borough. He was born in Dunston, Tyne and Wear, England.

References

English footballers
Ashington A.F.C. players
Wigan Borough F.C. players
English Football League players
1900 births
1974 deaths
Workington A.F.C. players
Association football outside forwards